Liolaemus foxi, Fox’s lizard, is a species of lizard in the family  Liolaemidae. It is native to Chile.

References

foxi
Reptiles described in 2000
Reptiles of Chile
Endemic fauna of Chile